Bistro 990 was a restaurant in Toronto, Ontario, Canada. It closed on March 17, 2012.  The bistro served Provençal style French cuisine in an informal atmosphere. Throughout its run the restaurant had been owned by Tom Kristenbrun.

History 

Its chef at opening was Chris Klugman who was responsible for several notable Toronto restaurants. The most recent chef was Christopher Hounsell.

The restaurant was a popular Toronto eatery for actors and other celebrities. It was located on Bay Street near Wellesley, just opposite the elite Sutton Place Hotel, and near most of Toronto's other luxury hotels. This district was also the centre of the annual Toronto International Film Festival for years. The Bistro had thus become popular among visiting celebrities.

In February 2012 it was announced that Bistro 990 would close and that the land would be used for a 32-storey condominium.

Demolition on the building began on January 28, 2013.

References

Restaurants in Toronto
Defunct French restaurants
French restaurants in Canada
Defunct restaurants in Canada
1988 establishments in Ontario
2012 disestablishments in Ontario
Restaurants established in 1988
Restaurants disestablished in 2012